Steven Robert Phoenix (born January 31, 1968) is a former pitcher in Major League Baseball. He played for the Oakland Athletics for two seasons in 1994 and 1995, pitching a total of six innings during both seasons combined. In 1994 his ERA was 6.23; in 1995 it was 32.40 (due to having allowed six runs in only 1.2 innings).

References

External links

1968 births
Living people
Major League Baseball pitchers
Oakland Athletics players
Baseball players from Phoenix, Arizona
Grand Canyon Antelopes baseball players
Arizona League Athletics players
American expatriate baseball players in Canada
Calgary Cannons players
Carolina Mudcats players
Edmonton Trappers players
Huntsville Stars players
Madison Muskies players
Modesto A's players
Tacoma Tigers players